Nicolaas Scholtz (born November 5, 1986) is a Namibian cricketer. He is a left-handed batsman and a leg-break bowler. He represented the Namibian cricket team in five Youth One-Day Internationals during the Under-19s World Cup of 2006.

Scholtz tends to occupy a mid-range position in the batting lineup. In 2007, he hit a career-best 64 in the ICC Continental Cup against Canada.

External links
Nicolaas Scholtz at Cricket Archive 

1986 births
Namibian Afrikaner people
Namibian people of German descent
White Namibian people
Living people
People from Keetmanshoop
Namibian cricketers
Namibian cricket captains